Rivals is a novel by the English author Jilly Cooper.  It is the second of the Rutshire Chronicles, a series of books set in the fictional English county of Rutshire.

Novels by Jilly Cooper
English novels
1988 British novels